Canosa may refer to:

 Canosa (surname), surname
 Canosa di Puglia, town and comune in the province of Barletta-Andria-Trani, Apulia, southern Italy
 Canosa Sannita, comune and town in the province of Chieti, Abruzzo, central Italy
 Canosa vases, type of pottery belonging to ancient Apulian vase painting

See also 

 Canossa (disambiguation)